William Swaluk (born 18 June 1938) is a Canadian weightlifter. He competed in the men's heavyweight event at the 1960 Summer Olympics.

References

1938 births
Living people
Canadian male weightlifters
Olympic weightlifters of Canada
Weightlifters at the 1960 Summer Olympics
Sportspeople from Thunder Bay
20th-century Canadian people
21st-century Canadian people